is a former Japanese football player.

Club statistics

References

External links

1980 births
Living people
University of Tsukuba alumni
Association football people from Fukuoka Prefecture
Japanese footballers
J1 League players
J2 League players
Avispa Fukuoka players
Albirex Niigata players
Nagoya Grampus players
Júbilo Iwata players
Tokushima Vortis players
Association football defenders